The Huazhong University of Science and Technology (HUST) is a public research university located in Guanshan Subdistrict, Hongshan District, Wuhan, Hubei province, China. As a national key university directly affiliated to the Ministry of Education of China, HUST is a Project 985 and Class A Double First Class University. HUST manages Wuhan National Laboratories for Opto-electronics (WNLO), which is one of the five national laboratories in China. HUST is also one of four Chinese universities eligible to run the national laboratory and the national major science and technology infrastructure. 

Huazhong University of Science and Technology was one of two Chinese universities awarded with the University Leadership Award by the Society of Manufacturing Engineers (SME), and elected as "China's Top Ten Research Institutions" by the academic journal Nature, called "The epitome of the higher education development of People's Republic of China".

Huazhong University of Science and Technology (HUST) ranked 96th globally, 14th in Asia and 8th in mainland China in Academic Ranking of World Universities (ARWU) 2022. It consistently features in the global top 200 research universities according to some of the most influential university rankings in the world such as Shanghai Ranking's Academic Ranking of World Universities, the Times Higher Education World University Rankings, and the U.S. News & World Report Best Global University Ranking.

History

Founding (1952–1954) 
In 1952, the Central Government of China sought to construct a new higher education system for the rapid development of economy, science and technology after Chinese Civil War. Three technical institutes were planned to be established in Wuhan, including Huazhong Institute of Technology (HIT, 华中工学院), South-Central China Institute of Power Engineering and South-Central China Institute of Water Conservancy and Electric Power. In March 1953, the institute's charter was signed by the South-Central China Government under the approval of the Central Government of China. In the original planning, the land south of the Yujia Hill was chosen for the three campuses. Physicist  was appointed as chair of the three-institute initiative. Economist Zhang Peigang was appointed as chief in planning to lead the HIT initiative. In June 1953, the land south of the East Lake was chosen as the campus of South-Central China Institute of Water Conservancy and Electric Power. The same year, the South-Central China government decided not to establish an independent South-Central China Institute of Power Engineering. All the programs related to power engineering were administered by Huazhong Institute of Technology. The institute formally opened on October 15, 1953.

Early development (1954–1966) 
All the programs and departments at HIT were organized and formed from the programs related to electrical engineering, power engineering, electricity and mechanical engineering in Wuhan University, Hunan University, Guangxi University and South China Institute of Technology. HIT's first classes were held in spaces at those institutions. There were eight undergraduate programs, 314 full-time faculty members and 2,639 undergraduate students at that time. The first president is physicist Qian Zha, Dean of School of Engineering of Wuhan University. The first provost is Gancai Liu.

In 1960, HIT was evaluated to be a national key university under the direct administration of the Ministry of Education of China.

Cultural Revolution (1966–1976) 
In 1971, most of the Wuhan Mechanical Institute was merged into the institute.

Six departments were established. There were 20 undergraduate programs, 1,097 faculty members. The number of undergraduate students reached to 6,087.

New mission, global view (1976–1988) 
Graduate students began to be enrolled in 1978, and in 1984, the institute became one of 22 universities to be approved by the State Council to establish a graduate school. By approval of the State Education Committee, the institute was renamed Huazhong University of Science and Technology (HUST, 华中理工大学) in 1988.

Leading the Reform in Tech-Schools (1988–2000) 
With China's global strategy and the reform of the economy, HUST led a series of pivotal reforms among technical institutions in China. HUST is the first technical school to establish the Department of Journalism and Communication, the Department of Economics, and Department of Literature, and to host nationwide lectures in humanities.

Merger 
On May 26, 2000, the former Huazhong University of Science and Technology, Tongji Medical University, Wuhan Urban Construction Institute, and Wuhan Science and Technology Vocational College combined to form the new Huazhong University of Science and Technology; the Chinese name was changed, but the English name remained the same.

Tongji Medical College 
The history of Tongji Medical College can be traced back to 1907 when Tongji German Medical School was founded by Erich Paulun in Shanghai. The name Tongji suggests cooperating by riding the same boat. In 1927, with the development of the institution, it expanded to include engineering programs. After the establishment of National Tongji University in 1927, the Tongji Medical College was affiliated to the university as one of the schools. In 1950, the medical school was moved to Wuhan from Shanghai and merged with Wuhan University School of Medicine to become South-Central China Tongji Medical College. The college was later renamed as Wuhan College of Medicine in 1955, as Tongji Medical University in 1985, and as Tongji Medical College of Huazhong University of Science and Technology in 2000.

Presidents 
 Zha Qian: (1953–1979)
 Zhu Jiusi: (1979–1984)
 Huang Shuhuai (1984–1993)
 Yang Shuzi (1993–1997) Member of the Chinese Academy of Sciences
 Zhou Ji (1997–2001) Member and former President of the Chinese Academy of Engineering
 Fan Mingwu (2001–2005) Member of the Chinese Academy of Engineering, former President of China Institute of Atomic Energy
 Li Peigen (2005–2014) Member of the Chinese Academy of Engineering
 Ding Lieyun (2014–2018) Member of the Chinese Academy of Engineering
 Li Yuanyuan (2018–present) Member of the Chinese Academy of Engineering

Campus 

Huazhong University of Science and Technology has two campuses: Main Campus at Wuchang and Tongji Medical Campus at Hankou. The area of single campus is more than 7000 mu. The campus reaches 72% green rate and thus is also known as "Forest University".

Main Campus at Wuchang 
1037 Luoyu Road, Wuchang, Wuhan

Tongji Medical Campus at Hankou 
13 Hangkong Road, Hankou, Wuhan

Schools and departments

Sciences and Engineering 
 School of Physics
 School of Automation
 Department of Electronic Sci. & Tech.
 Department of Electronics & Information Engr.
 Department of Mathematics
 School of Architecture & Urban Planning
 School of Chemistry & Chemical Engr.
 School of Computer Sciences & Engr.
 School of Civil & Hydraulic Engineering.
 School of Cyber Sciences & Engr.
 School of Electrical & Electronic Engr.
 School of Energy & Power Engineering
 School of Environmental Science & Engr.
 School of Life Sciences & Technology
 School of Materials Science & Engr.
 School of Mechanical Science & Engr.
 School of Naval Architecture & Ocean Engr.
 School of Aerospace Engineering
 School of Optical & Electronic Information
 School of Software Engineering
 School of Transportation Sci. & Engr.

Social Sciences 
 Department of Chinese Literature
 Department of Philosophy
 Department of Political Science
 Department of Sociology
 School of Economics
 School of Education
 School of Foreign Language
 School of Humanities & Social Sciences
 School of International Education
 School of Journalism & Communication
 School of Law
 School of Management
 School of Public Administration

Medicine (Tongji Medical College) 
 Department of Forensic Medicine
 Basic Medical School
 School of Clinical Medicine I
 School of Clinical Medicine II
 School of Drug & Health Administration
 School of Nursing
 School of Pharmacy
 School of Public Health

Academic Power

Faculty and staff 
 Faculty: 3,448
 Staff (main campus): 7,659
 Staff (hospitals): 5,259
 Distinguished Youth Scholars awarded by National Science Fund: 69
 Chang Jiang Scholars (Distinguished Professors): 65
 Members of Chinese Academy of Sciences: 12
 Members of Chinese Academy of Engineering: 17

National scientific platforms

National Laboratory 
 Wuhan National Laboratories for Opto-electronics (WNLO), one of the five national laboratories in China

National major science and technology infrastructure 
 Wuhan National High Magnetic Field Center, one of Top 4 magnetic field centers in the world, Top 1 in Asia.
 Precision gravity measurement research facility, known as "World Gravity Center" by the international physics circle, measuring the most accurate gravitational constant in 2018.

National Innovation Institute 
 National Innovation Institute of Digital Design and Manufacturing

State Key Laboratory 
 State Key Laboratory of Digital Manufacturing Equipment and Technology
 State Key Laboratory of Coal Combustion
 State Key Laboratory of Materials Processing and Die & Mould Technology
 State Key Laboratory of Advanced Electromagnetic Engineering and Technology (AEET)

National Engineering (Technology) Research Center 
 National Engineering Research Center for Laser Processing
 National Engineering Research Center for Digital Manufacturing Equipment
 National Engineering Technology Research Center for Enterprise Information Technology (CAD) Application Support Software (Wuhan)
 National NC System Engineering Research Center
 National Anti-counterfeiting Engineering Technology Research Center
 National Nanomedical Engineering Technology Research Center

National Engineering Laboratory 
 National Engineering Laboratory of Next Generation Internet Access System

National Professional Laboratory 
 National Professional Laboratory of New Motor
 National Professional Laboratory of External Storage Systems

Essential Science Indicators（ESI） 
In ESI ranking in January 2021, Huazhong University of Science and Technology is ranked in 183rd in the world, and 9th among all the Double First Class Universities in China. The numbers of top 1‰ and 1% disciplines of HUST in the world are 4 and 16 respectively.
Top 1‰ disciplines include Engineering, Computer Science, Materials Science and Clinic Medicine. Top 1% disciplines include Engineering, Computer Science, Materials Science, Clinic Medicine, Chemistry, Pharmacology & Toxicology, Biology & Biochemistry, Physics, Neuroscience & Behavior, Social Sciences, Molecular Biology & Genetics, Mathematics, Environment/Ecology, Agricultural Sciences, Botany and Zoology.

Discipline category 
Undergraduate|Graduate
Engineering: #6 | #3;
Medicine: #2 | #2;
Management: #10 | #15;
Science: #16 | #17; 
Economics: #20 |-;
Literature: #36 |-;
Natural Sciences (Engineering, Medicine, Science overall): #7 | #6;
Social Sciences (History, Management, Economics overall): #17 | #18

Programs 
Mechanical Engineering: #1;
Electrical Engineering: #2;
Optical Engineering: #1;
Public Health: #1;
Public Administration: #4;
Biomedical Engineering: #5;
Control Engineering: #5 ;
Power Engineering: #6;
Computer Science: #9;
Electronics: #9;

Subjects 
Preventive Medicine
Epidemiology: #5;
Environmental Health: #1;
Nutrition: #5;
Gynecology: #2;
Toxicology: #6;

Computer Science
System Structure: #3;
Software: #12 ;

Journalism & Communication
Journalism: #3;
Communication: #7;

Others
Statistics: #6;
Quantitative Economics: #3;

Rankings and reputation 
Internationally, Huazhong University of Science and Technology is regarded as one of the most reputable Chinese universities by the Times Higher Education World Reputation Rankings where it ranked 151st globally. HUST graduates are highly desired nationwide; in the QS Graduate Employability Rankings 2017, HUST was ranked # 71-80 in the world.

HUST consistently features in the global top 200 research universities according to some of the most widely cited university rankings in the world such as ShanghaiRanking's Academic Ranking of World Universities, the Times Higher Education World University Rankings, and the U.S. News & World Report Best Global University Ranking.
 2022 Academic Ranking of World Universities: 96th in the world, 14th in Asia, and 8th in China.
 2023 U.S. News & World Report Best Global University Ranking (U.S. News): 109th in the world, 15th in Asia and 6th in China.
 2022 U.S. News & World Report Best Global University Ranking (U.S. News): 176th in the world, 24th in Asia and 10th in China.
 2023 Times Higher Education: 176th in the world and 10th in China.
 2022 Times Higher Education: 181st in the world, 26th in Asia and 10th in China.
 2019 Academic Ranking of World Universities: 101–150th in the world, 11th in Asia, and 5th–8th in China.
 2018 China University Ranking issued by Wu Shulian: the 8th in China.
 2020 China University Ranking issued by Wu Shulian: the 7th in China.
 2015 Best Chinese Universities Ranking issued by Shanghai Ranking Consultancy: the 9th in China.
 2022 Best Chinese Universities Ranking issued by Shanghai Ranking Consultancy: the 8th in China.

Services

Libraries 

There are four libraries at HUST: the Old Library, the Shaw Library (New Library), the Medical Library and the Architecture Library. The Old Library and the Shaw Library are located in the center of main campus. The Old Library was designed and constructed in Soviet Union style in the 1950s. It plays a major role in book circulation and conference hosting. It also provides classrooms for audio-video teaching program and some group-study programs. The first floor of the east wing is the Center for Reader's Services, which is a branch of University Bookstore System. The Shaw Library was donated by Sir Run Run Shaw and built in the 1990s. It has more than 30 reading rooms, including Chinese/English social sciences reading rooms, Chinese/English natural sciences reading rooms, Chinese/English archive reading rooms and electronic journal reading rooms. It also houses a multi-media center and a major branch of Center for Computing & Networking. Medical Library is located in Tongji Medical Campus in Hankou. It provides the same services to the medical students as the libraries in main campus. The Architecture Library is on the east side of the main campus. It accommodates books and journals in architecture and urban planning. The University Libraries have a total collection of 3.49 million volumes.

Student life

Student demographics 
Undergraduate students: 36,275 
Graduate & professional students: 20,044 
International students: 4,100

Athletics 
HUST men's basketball team has won national championship (CUBA) in 2004. HUST men's team also won the fourth place in CUBA 1999. HUST women's basketball team lost the national champion titles and won the second places in WCUBA 2005 and 2006.

Notable alumni

Politicians 
 Lou Qinjian, HUST Class 1981, CPC Secretary of Jiangsu Province, former Governor of Shaanxi Province and Vice Minister of Information Industry
 Qian Xinzhong, Tongji Class 1928, Minister of Health, China (1965–1973, 1979–1983)
 Xie Fuzhan, HUST Class 1980, President of Chinese Academy of Social Sciences, the former Governor of Henan Province, China.
 Zhou Ji, HUST Class 1980, President, China Academy of Engineering (2010–2018), Minister of Education, China (2003–2009), Mayor of Wuhan (2001–2002)
 Wang Cheng, HUST Class 1981, President, Hohai University.
 Luo Jun, HUST Class 1978, President of Sun Yat-sen University, Professor of School of Physics in HUST.
 Duan Xianzhong, HUST Class 1983, President of Hunan University.

Sportspeople 
 Li Ting, HUST Class 2006, tennis player, Gold Medal Winner at the 2004 Summer Olympics in women's doubles.
 Li Na, HUST Class 2005, tennis player, Winner of Australian Open (2014) and French Open (2011), highest world ranking for Singles: No. 2.

Businesspeople 
 Gong Hongjia, HUST Class 1982, billionaire businessman, 137th in 2018 Forbes World billionaires list in 2018
 Meng Wanzhou, chief financial officer and deputy board chairperson of Huawei.
 Wang Chaoyong (汪潮涌), HUST Youth Class 1980, businessman.
 Zhang Xiaolong, HUST Class 1991, Senior Vice President of Tencent, creator of WeChat.

Scientists 

 Julong Deng, the founder of Grey system theory.
 Sifeng Liu, the Marie-Curie Fellow (UK), IEEE Fellow and the renowned expert of grey systems. He was one of the 10 shortlisted promising scientists in the MSCA (EU-funded Marie Curie Actions) 2017 Prizes.
 Chunying Chen, Chinese chemist and professor of chemistry at the National Center for Nanoscience and Technology
 Gang Chen, professor at MIT and elected member of the National Academy of Engineering (2010）
 Lihong Wang, professor at Caltech and elected member of the National Academy of Engineering (2018)
 Alan Luo, professor at Ohio State University and elected member of the National Academy of Engineering (2023)
 Frank Hu, professor at Harvard and elected member of the National Academy of Medicine(2015)
 Guoli Ming, professor at University of  Pennsylvania and elected member of the National Academy of Medicine(2019)

Members of the China Academy of Sciences 
 Bei Shizhang, elected in 1955, Tongji Med BS (1921).
 Liang Boqiang, elected in 1955, Pathologist, Tongji Med BS (1922).
 Qiu Fazu, elected in 1993, Senior Member of CAS, Tongji Med BS (1936).
 Wu Min (吴旻), elected in 1980, Tongji Med BS (1950).
 Wu Mengchao, elected in 1991, 2005 National Supreme Science and Technology Awardee, Tongji Med BS (1949).
 Yang Shuzi, elected in 1991, HUST BS (1956).
 Cheng Shijie (程时杰), elected in 2007, HUST MS (1981).
 Luo Jun (罗俊), elected in 2009, HUST BS (1982), MS (1985).
 Ding Han (丁汉), elected in 2013, HUST Ph.D. (1989).
 Chen Xiaoping (陈孝平), elected in 2015, HUST Tongji Med MS (1982), Ph.D. (1985).
 Zhu Zhongliang (朱中梁), elected in 1999, HUST BS (1961).
 Zheng Xiaojing (郑晓静), elected in 2009, President of Xi'an University of Electronic Science and Technology, HUST BS (1982).
 Xu Tao (徐涛), elected in 2017, Vice President of University of the Chinese Academy of Sciences, HUST BS (1992), Ph.D. (1997).
 Zhang Qingjie (张清杰), elected in 2017, President of Wuhan University of Technology, HUST BS (1984), Ph.D. (1990).
 Fang Fuquan (方复全), elected in 2017, Vice President of Capital Normal University, HUST BS (1986).

Members of the China Academy of Engineering 
 Zhou Ji, elected in 1999, President of Chinese Academy of Engineering, foreign member of National Academy of Engineering (US), HUST MS (1980).
 Hou Yunde, National Supreme Science and Technology Awardee (2018), Vice president of Chinese Academy of Engineering, HUST Tongji Med BS (1955).
 Li Dequn (李德群), elected in 2015, HUST MS (1980).
 Ma Ding (马丁), elected in 2017, HUST Tongji Med BS (1982), MS (1986), Ph.D. (1990).
 Guo Konghui (郭孔辉), elected in 1994, HUST BS (1956).
 Cen Kefa (岑可法), elected in 1995, HUST BS (1956).
 Lu Daopei (陆道培), elected in 1996, HUST Tongji Med BS (1955).
 Pan Yuan (潘桓), elected in 1997, HUST BS (1955).
 Zhang Yongchuan (张勇传), elected in 1997, HUST BS (1957).
 Yao Shaofu (姚绍福), elected in 1997, HUST BS (1954).
 Fan Mingwu (樊明武), elected in 1999, Former president of HUST, Former president of the Chinese Academy of Atomic Energy Sciences, HUST BS (1965).
 Li Peigen (李培根), elected in 2003, Former president of HUST, HUST MS (1981).
 Ye Shenghua (叶声华), elected in 2003, HUST BS (1956).
 Zhou Honghao (周宏灏), elected in 2005, HUST Tongji Med BS (1962).
 Tan Jianrong (谭建荣), elected in 2007, HUST MS (1987).
 Yang Baofeng (杨宝峰), elected in 2009, President of Harbin Medical University, HUST Tongji Med BS (1988).
 Luo Xiwen (罗锡文), elected in 2009, Vice president of South China Agricultural University, HUST BS (1969).
 Huang Weihe (黄维和), elected in 2013, HUST MS (1999).
 Yang Huayong (杨华勇), elected in 2013, HUST BS (1982).
 Guo Jianbo (郭剑波), elected in 2013, HUST BS (1982).
 Hu Shengshou (胡盛寿), elected in 2013, HUST Tongji Med BS (1982).
 You Zheng (尤政), elected in 2013, Vice president of Tsinghua University, HUST BS (1985), MS (1987), Ph.D. (1990).
 Niu Xinqiang (钮新强), elected in 2013, HUST Ph.D. (2005).
 Wu Weiren (吴伟仁), elected in 2015, Chief Designer of Lunar Exploration Engineering, HUST Ph.D. (2004).
 Liu Jizhen (刘吉臻), elected in 2015, President of North China Electric Power University, HUST Ph.D. (2007).
 Zou Xuexiao (邹学校), elected in 2017, President of Hunan Academy of Agricultural Sciences, HUST Ph.D. (2002).

References

External links 

 Huazhong University of Science and Technology 

 
Universities in China with English-medium medical schools
Universities and colleges in Wuhan
Vice-ministerial universities in China
Project 985
Project 211
Universities and colleges formed by merger in China